Mylon R. LeFevre (born October 6, 1944) is an  American Christian rock singer best known for his work with his band Mylon and Broken Heart. He is a member of the Gospel Music Hall of Fame. He travels around the United States, ministering, teaching and singing. He sometimes can be seen on television networks, such as TBN, Daystar and Victory Channel.

Biography

Early years
Born on October 6, 1944 in Gulfport, Mississippi into the pioneering Southern gospel family, The LeFevres, Mylon was the youngest son of Eva Mae and Urias LeFevre. When he was old enough, he began to sing and play guitar with the group.

As a teen, LeFevre was expelled from a private religious high school when his father took him out to be with the family while they performed at a local concert. At 17 years old, while in the Army where he was paid $84 per month, he wrote his first song, "Without Him." While stationed at Fort Jackson, South Carolina, the LeFevres were performing at a gospel convention in Memphis. That weekend, LeFevre hitchhiked over 600 miles to get there. Onstage, singing "Without Him", he did not know that Elvis Presley was there. After the concert, Elvis asked to meet LeFevre. Shortly thereafter, Elvis recorded the song for his album, How Great Thou Art, and within the next year, over a hundred artists would record his song. According to LeFevre, writing the song took about twenty minutes and produced an initial royalty check of approximately $90,000. With that money he purchased his first car, a Chevrolet Corvette, one of many sports cars he would own.

After leaving the army, LeFevre became a member of the famed Stamps Quartet (1966–1968). In 1964 LeFevre released his first solo album, New Found Joy, on Skylite Records. In 1968, LeFevre would release Your Only Tomorrow.

LeFevre wanted to write and sing contemporary music that gives glory to God, but there seemed to be no place for his music—or his longer hair and long sideburns—in his family or the Church. His first mainstream album, entitled Mylon, We Believe (Atlantic/Cotillion Records 1970), is considered by some to be the first true "Jesus Rock" album, although Larry Norman's Upon This Rock preceded this album by about a year. LeFevre took the classic song, "Gospel Ship", setting the familiar southern gospel melody to rock & roll tempo.

1970s–early 1980s
In 1970, LeFevre signed with Columbia Records, and formed the "Holy Smoke Doo Dah Band" with Auburn Burrell and J.P. Lauzon on guitar, drummer Marty Simon, Tom Robb on bass and keyboardist Lester Langdale. From 1970 through 1980, he recorded and performed with Eric Clapton, Elton John, Billy Joel, Duane Allman, Berry Oakley, Little Richard, and the Who, among others.

The album On the Road to Freedom was produced by Alvin Lee and recorded in George Harrison's studio with Ron Wood, Steve Winwood, Jim Capaldi and Mick Fleetwood, & released in 1973 . Lee & Harrison are also contributing writer/musicians. In 1974, he appeared as a fill-in vocalist on several tracks for The Atlanta Rhythm Section's album Third Annual Pipe Dream.

LeFevre started getting high to deal with the stress and to fit in. His drug use escalated to a near-fatal overdose of heroin in 1973. So LeFevre committed himself to a drug treatment program that year. Seven months later, LeFevre came out clean.

In 1976 LeFevre met Danny Davenport, a promotion exec with Warner Bros. and the two of them became friends.  That friendship escalated into a Warner Bros. contract which yielded two albums: Weak at the Knees and Love Rustler.

In 1980, LeFevre attended a concert by the CCM group, 2nd Chapter of Acts. Their long hair and music showed that they weren't concerned with outward appearances, but with issues of the heart. Buck Herring, the group's leader, led the people in prayer and LeFevre prayed along and submitted to Jesus as the Lord of his life.

Broken Heart era
LeFevre quit secular rock and returned to his home church at Mt. Paran Church of God, in Atlanta—where he worked as a janitor, while attending Bible-study classes. His first challenge was to get out of his music contract which, according to the terms, could only be broken "by an act of God". LeFevre's attorney argued that being born again is an act of God and won the case. In return for release from his contract, LeFevre agreed to give up all future royalties on his songs, publishing and recordings.

In 1981, he started a Christian band called The Gathering Ground Band, later to be renamed Airborn with some musicians he met in the Bible study: Dean Harrington (lead guitar, vocals, percussion), Don Woods (drums/percussion), Kim Klaudt (bass), Mike Adams (rhythm guitar) and Michael Milsap (keyboards). In 1982, the band changed their name to Broken Heart. A small offshoot gospel label from MCA Records known as Songbird released Broken Heart's first album Brand New Start (1982), with members: Dean Harrington, Kenny Bentley (bass/vocals), Stan Coates (keyboards/vocals), Ben Hewitt (drums/percussion), and Mike Adams. Others musicians who helped with the first album were: Joe Hardy (bass, guitars, percussion), John Hampton (drums), Ed DeGarmo (of DeGarmo and Key; organ/synthesizer), Jack Holder (guitar/background vocals), Phil Driscoll (trumpet/flugelhorn). Later members of the band included: Tim Huffman (guitars/vocals) and Scott Allen (rhythm guitar/vocals). Other musicians who helped with other albums over the years were Kerry Livgren (of Kansas), Phil Keaggy, Ed Zimmerman, The 2nd Chapter of Acts, The group Sevenfold, and Jimi Jamison. Two more albums came out in 1983, More and Live Forever (recorded at Six Flags Over Georgia).

Over the next 10 years, the group released 10 albums and traveled over a million miles. In 1987, the group attempted to cross over to mainstream rock by rechristening itself 'Look Up!' and releasing an album with Columbia Records. The album contains a retooled updating of "Peace Begins Within" from the We Believe album and a cover of DeGarmo and Key's "Love is All You Need". Over the years guitarists Scott Allen, David Payton, Trent Argante, and Skip Benicky and keyboardists Stan Coates, Paul Joseph, and Marshall Pratt were also members. Many members of Broken Heart have gone on to become solo artists, music producers, worship leaders, pastors, and teachers.

In 1987, the band received a Rock Album of the Year GMA Dove Award for Crack the Sky. That same year, they received a Grammy Award for Best Gospel Performance by a Duo, Group, Choir, or Chorus.

About this period (1982–1991), LeFevre said, "I was a Christian musician who preached a little, worshiped a little, and rocked a lot." Then in mid-1989 he suffered a heart attack on a tour bus while touring with White Heart. Doctors advised him to stop touring, but against the physicians advice LeFevre completed his scheduled obligations and finished his concert tours. Mylon and Broken Heart would continue touring through 1990 to support Crank It Up. They disbanded after the tour completed.

Solo career to present
In 1992, LeFevre inked a solo recording deal with Star Song Records and began releasing material that was less musically "edgy" than past offerings. His first release for them, Faith Hope and Love, included guest appearances from Carman, 4Him, Michael W. Smith and Steven Curtis Chapman among other popular Christian musicians of the day along with Broken Heart bandmates Bentley, Hardy and Hewitt.

Following his heart attack, LeFevre increasingly turned to preaching and teaching as his vocation. He and his wife Christi minister in about 75 churches a year. He has also spoken at motorcycle rallies, NASCAR owner/driver chapel services, NFL and NBA chapel services, and in Russia, Australia, Canada, the Philippines, the Cayman Islands, and Mexico. His most recent music release is 2003's Bow Down, produced by his son-in-law Peter Furler of the Christian band Newsboys. The couple's home church is Eagle Mountain International Church in Newark, Texas.

LeFevre's mother Eva Mae was hospitalized with pneumonia, as well as a fractured hip, in April and died on May 18, 2009 in Atlanta, Georgia at age 91. She was inducted into the Gospel Music Hall of Fame, in 1978, and was the first woman to be inducted into the Georgia Music Hall of Fame, in 1985.

Discography

1964: New Found Joy
1968: Your Only Tomorrow
1970: Mylon (We Believe)
1971: With Holy Smoke
1972: Over the Influence
1973: On the Road to Freedom (with Alvin Lee)
1977: Kim Larsen & The Yankee Boys (Vocal)
1977: Weak at the Knees
1978: Love Rustler
1980: Rock 'N Roll Resurrection
1982: Brand New Start
1983: More
1983: Live Forever
1985: Sheep In Wolves Clothing
1986: Look Up!
1987: Crack the Sky
1988: Face the Music
1989: Big World
1990: Crank It Up
1992: A Decade of Love
1993: Faith, Hope, & Love

Awards

Grammy
1987: Best Gospel Performance by a Duo or Group, Choir or Chorus for Crack the Sky

GMA Dove Awards
1988: Rock Album of the Year for Crack the Sky
1989: Rock Song of the Year for "Won by One"

References

External links
Mylon LeFevre Ministries
Tribute to Mylon LeFevre
[ Mylon LeFevre] at Allmusic
Georgia Music Hall of Fame Website

1944 births
American gospel singers
Grammy Award winners
Living people
People from Gulfport, Mississippi
Singers from Mississippi
Atlantic Records artists
Warner Records artists
Columbia Records artists
Mercury Records artists
Janitors